Melaleuca boeophylla is a plant in the myrtle family, Myrtaceae and is endemic to the south-west of Western Australia. It is similar to a number of other Western Australian melaleucas such as M. filifolia with its purple pom-pom flower heads but its leaves are shorter and oval in cross-section.

Description
The tip of the leaf is a rounded point and the oil glands are distinct.

The flowers are a shade of pink to purple and arranged in heads on the ends of branches which continue to grow after flowering, sometimes also in the leaf axils. The stamens are arranged in bundles of five around the flower, with 9 to 11 stamens in each bundle.

Taxonomy and naming
Melaleuca boeophylla was first formally described in 1999 by Lyndley Craven and Brendan Lepschi in Australian Systematic Botany from a specimen collected near the Kalbarri National Park. The specific epithet (boeophylla) is from the Greek  meaning 'strap' and  'leaf', referring to the leaf shape of this species.

Distribution and habitat
This melaleuca occurs in the Kalbarri district in the Carnarvon and Geraldton Sandplains biogeographic regions.

Conservation status
Melaleuca boeophylla is listed as "Priority Two" by the Government of Western Australia Department of Parks and Wildlife meaning that it is known from only a few locations but is not currently in imminent danger.

References

boeophylla
Myrtales of Australia
Plants described in 1999
Endemic flora of Western Australia
Taxa named by Lyndley Craven